Fenimorea alba is a species of sea snail, a marine gastropod mollusc in the family Drilliidae.

Description
The length of this marine shell varies between 14 mm and 22 mm.

Distribution
This marine species occurs in the Caribbean Sea off the coast of Panama.

References

External links
  Fallon P.J. (2016). Taxonomic review of tropical western Atlantic shallow water Drilliidae (Mollusca: Gastropoda: Conoidea) including descriptions of 100 new species. Zootaxa. 4090(1): 1–363
 

alba
Gastropods described in 2016